Carleton is a surname. Notable people with the surname include:

Alex Carleton (born 1968), American fashion and home-goods designer
Billie Carleton (1896–1918), British actress
Bridget Carleton (born 1997), Canadian basketball player
Charles A. Carleton (1836–1897), American Union Civil War era brevet brigadier general
Christopher Carleton (1749–1787), British Army officer
Claire Carleton (1913–1979), American actress 
Dudley Carleton, Viscount Dorchester (1573–1632), English statesman and diplomat
Dudley Carleton (diplomat) (1599–1654), nephew of the above, diplomat and clerk of the Privy Council
Ezra C. Carleton (1838–1911), U.S. Representative from Michigan
George Carleton (1529–1590), prosecuted for involvement in the Marprelate controversy
George Carleton (bishop) (1559–1628), Bishop of Llandaff
George W. Carleton, publisher, New York, (1832–1901), published the books of Miriam Coles Harris.
George Carleton (1885–1950), American character actor 
Guy Carleton (bishop) (1605–1685), Anglican clergyman
Guy Carleton, 1st Baron Dorchester (1724–1808), governor of Quebec and a general of British troops during the American War of Independence
Henry Boyle, 1st Baron Carleton (1669–1725), English politician
Hugh Carleton (1810–1890), New Zealand politician
Isaac Newton Carleton (1832–1902), founder of Carleton School for Boys in Bradford, Massachusetts
James Henry Carleton (1814–1873), American major general
Jesse Carleton (1862–1921), American golfer
John Carleton (disambiguation)
Marie-Helene Carleton, American writer, photographer and filmmaker
Mark A. Carleton (1866–1925), American botanist and plant pathologist
Mark T. Carleton (1935–1995), Louisiana historian
Mary Carleton (1642–1673), Englishwoman who used false identities to marry and defraud a number of men
Nicholas Carleton (c1570–1630), English composer
Peter Carleton (1755–1828), U.S. Representative from New Hampshire
Richard Carleton (1943–2006), Australian journalist
Robert Louis Carleton (1896–1956), American composer who wrote "Ja-Da!"
Thomas Carleton (c. 1735 – 1817), first lieutenant governor of New Brunswick
Walter Tenney Carleton (1867–1900), one of the three founding directors of NEC Corporation
Wayne Carleton (born 1946), retired Canadian ice hockey player
William McKendree "Will" Carleton (1845–1912), American poet, who wrote mostly about rural life
William Carleton (1794–1869), Irish novelist
William Carleton (Massachusetts businessman) (1797–1876), American businessman
William P. Carleton (1872–1947), American actor

English-language surnames
Welsh-language surnames